Joshua Booth Green (born February 11, 1970) is an American politician and physician serving since 2022 as the ninth governor of Hawaii. A member of the Democratic Party, he served as the 15th lieutenant governor of Hawaii from 2018 to 2022, a member of the Hawaii Senate from 2008 to 2018 and as a member of the Hawaii House of Representatives from 2004 to 2008.

Early life and education
Green was born on February 11, 1970, in Kingston, New York. He was raised in Pittsburgh, Pennsylvania. He attended Quaker Valley High School, where he graduated as one of four valedictorians in 1988; as a Quaker Valley student, he was president of the Key Club and played on the school's soccer and tennis teams.

Green received a Bachelor of Science in anthropology from Swarthmore College in 1992 and his Doctor of Medicine from the Penn State Milton S. Hershey Medical Center at Pennsylvania State University in 1997. He subsequently completed a three-year residency in family medicine at the University of Pittsburgh.

In 2022, Swarthmore College awarded Green an honorary Doctorate of Science.

Medical career
After completing his residency in 2000, Green joined the National Health Service Corps and was stationed in Hawaii as a physician for the Big Island. He practiced family medicine and worked in emergency rooms. At times, he was the only physician in the island's rural areas.

Green has been awarded Physician of the Year by the Hawaii Medical Association twice in his career, first in 2009, and again in 2022 for his leadership and service during the COVID-19 pandemic. He has remained a physician in Hawaii's rural emergency departments while serving in public office and returns to the Big Island to practice medicine.

Early political career

Hawaii House of Representatives 
Green was elected to the Hawaii House of Representatives in 2004. He represented the 6th district, based in a rural area of the western portion of the Big Island. Green served two terms before being elected to the Hawaii Senate in 2008.

Hawaii Senate 
Green was first elected to the Hawaii Senate in 2008. He represented the 3rd district, which encompassed the southwestern portion of the Big Island. He was reelected in 2012 and 2014. As a state senator, Green served as majority leader and chaired the Committee on Health and Human Services.

In 2013, Green was honored as "Hawaii Legislator of the Year". He championed the initiative to create an insurance mandate for children with autism via legislation known as Luke's Law. The legislation went into effect on January 1, 2016.

In 2018, Green fought to establish a legal safeguard so that parents with disabilities would no longer have their children taken away from them because of their disabilities. He also led the charge to raise the legal age to obtain tobacco products and electronic cigarettes from 18 to 21, making Hawaii the first state to do so.

Green opted not to run for reelection to the Senate in 2018. He was succeeded by Dru Kanuha, who now serves as majority leader.

Lieutenant governor of Hawaii 

In 2018, Green won the Democratic primary for lieutenant governor of Hawaii and was the running mate of incumbent Democratic governor David Ige, who was running for a second term. Ige and Green won the general election on November 6, 2018.

Ige tasked Green with addressing Hawaii's chronic homelessness crisis and called on him to use his background as a physician to address how mental illness and addiction affect Hawaii's homeless population.

In 2019, shortly before the COVID-19 pandemic, Green led a team of over 75 doctors, nurses and other Hawaii health care workers on an emergency medical mission to Western Samoa. They aided in vaccination efforts against a measles epidemic across the region.

On March 3, 2020, Ige appointed Green as the administration's liaison between the state and healthcare community as it pertains to COVID-19 preparedness and response.

A poll conducted in April 2021 by Hawaii News Now found that Green had a 63% approval rating, with only 17% of voters disapproving of his work as lieutenant governor, while Ige held an approval rating of 22%. It is speculated that Green's visibility throughout the COVID-19 pandemic and background as an emergency room doctor contributed to the difference.

2022 Hawaii gubernatorial campaign 

In August 2019, Green announced he was considering a run for governor of Hawaii in the 2022 election. He launched his gubernatorial campaign on February 10, 2022.

Green won the Democratic primary on August 13, 2022; his running mate was Democratic state representative Sylvia Luke. On November 8, 2022, Green won the general election, defeating Republican nominee and former Hawaii Lieutenant Governor Duke Aiona in the general election.

Governor of Hawaii

Personal life
Green is Jewish. He married Jaime Ushiroda in 2006. The couple met when Ushiroda, a family law expert, was clerking for Suzanne Chun Oakland, who was chair of the State's Human Services committee. They have two children.

Green is a fan of the Pittsburgh Steelers.

Electoral history

2018

2022

References

External links

Governor of the State of Hawai'i official government website
 Josh Green for Hawaii campaign website
 
 Profile at the Hawaii State Legislature (archived)

|-

|-

|-

|-

|-

|-

 

1970 births
21st-century American physicians
21st-century American politicians
21st-century American Jews
Democratic Party governors of Hawaii
Democratic Party Hawaii state senators
Democratic Party members of the Hawaii House of Representatives
Jewish American state governors of the United States
Jewish American state legislators in Hawaii
Jewish physicians
Lieutenant Governors of Hawaii
Living people
Penn State College of Medicine alumni
Swarthmore College alumni